Harpa (English: Harp) is a concert hall and conference centre in Reykjavík, Iceland. The opening concert was held on May 4, 2011. The building features a distinctive colored glass facade inspired by the basalt landscape of Iceland.

History 

Harpa was designed by the Danish firm Henning Larsen Architects in co-operation with Danish-Icelandic artist Olafur Eliasson. The structure consists of a steel framework clad with geometric shaped glass panels of different colours. The building was originally part of a redevelopment of the Austurhöfn area dubbed World Trade Center Reykjavík, which was temporarily abandoned when the 2008 Icelandic financial crisis took hold. The development was originally intended to include a 400-room hotel, luxury apartments, retail units, restaurants, a car park and the new headquarters of Icelandic bank Landsbanki. These related developments were put on hold, but resumed construction by 2018 and as of 2022, the development is almost complete. The Reykjavik Edition Hotel, managed by Marriott International opened in 2021 along with retail and restaurant units; Landsbankinn is projected to move into their newly constructed headquarters in early 2023.

Construction started in 2007 but was halted with the start of the financial crisis. The completion of the structure was uncertain until the government decided in 2008 to fully fund the rest of the construction costs for the half-built concert hall. For several years it was the only construction project in existence in Iceland. The building was given its name on the Day of Icelandic Music on 11 December 2009, prior to which it was called Reykjavík Concert Hall and Conference Centre. The building is the first purpose-built concert hall in Reykjavík and it was developed in consultation with artistic advisor Vladimir Ashkenazy and international consultant Jasper Parrott of HarrisonParrott. It houses the Iceland Symphony Orchestra and the offices of The Icelandic Opera.

In the opening concert on 4 May 2011, Iceland Symphony Orchestra performed under the baton of Vladimir Ashkenazy with the Icelandic pianist Víkingur Ólafsson as soloist. The concert was broadcast live on RÚV, the Icelandic National Broadcasting Service. In the water next to Harpa is located the sculpture The Musician (1970) by the Icelandic sculptor Ólöf Pálsdóttir. The statue is of a cellist playing, and is modelled on the Danish cellist Erling Blöndal Bengtsson, who played constantly for Ólöf as he sat for her. When the Orchestra was based at its previous home at the Háskólabíó, the statue was located on Hagatorg, but it followed the Orchestra in 2014.

The Icelandic Opera performs at the concert hall even though the venue is primarily designed for concerts, lacking a curtain, proscenium, and any of the traditional stage machinery.

Harpa is operated by Portus, a company owned by the Icelandic government and the City of Reykjavík.

In 2013, the building won the European Union's Mies van der Rohe award for contemporary architecture.

The first director of Harpa was Halldór Guðmundsson. The current director of Harpa is Svanhildur Konráðsdótir.

In 2017, the venue held the annual World Yo-Yo Contest, where over a thousand contestants from over 30 countries competed for the six champion titles. It was only the second time ever the contest was held in Europe. Japanese competitors swept the five freestyle divisions, while Swiss performance art duo Inmot!on won the artistic performance division.

Appearances in popular culture 

In its unfinished state, Harpa (under the earlier name Tónlistarhús) appears in Gæska: Skáldsaga by Eiríkur Örn Norðdahl, where it is temporarily turned into a mosque with the addition of a minaret.

It was the setting of an episode of the Netflix series Sense8.

It appeared in the Netflix series Black Mirror on the episode "Crocodile".

It’s the site of the “rose ceremony from hell” in Clayton’s season of The Bachelor.

References

External links 

  
 Harpa Concert Hall in arkitekturbilleder.dk
 Rowan Moore, "Harpa Concert Hall – in pictures: A stunning new concert Hall in Reykjavik is the result of a collaboration between Henning Larsen Architects and the artist Olafur Eliasson", The Guardian 28 August 2011.

Buildings and structures in Reykjavík
Music venues completed in 2011
2011 establishments in Iceland
Tourist attractions in Reykjavík
Music venues in Iceland
Convention centers